Mending Fences (working titles The View From Here and Prosper's Last Stand) is a television film premiered in Hallmark Channel on July 18, 2009. It stars Laura Leighton and Angie Dickinson (in her final film role).

Plot
Kelly Faraday (Laura Leighton) is a television reporter who goes back to her hometown of Prosper, Nevada with her teenage daughter Kamilla (Shanley Caswell).  Upon her arrival she finds that the town is in the middle of a drought.  Kelly's mother Ruth (Angie Dickinson) must move forward from their estrangement to work together in stopping the casino developments which threaten the town's water supply.

Cast
 Laura Leighton - Kelly Faraday
 Angie Dickinson - Ruth Hanson
 Shanley Caswell - Kamilla Faraday
 David Lee Smith - Walt Mitchell
 Ryan Kelley - Chuck Bentley
 Pat Crawford Brown - County Clerk
 Peter Jason - Hank Bentley
 Joel Murray - Sam Bridgewater
 Jeff Kober - Jack Norris Jr.

Production
On November 18, 2008, it was announced Laura Leighton and Angie Dickinson were set to star in a Hallmark Channel Original Movie, The View From Here. For Leighton, it was her second Hallmark Channel Original Movie, the first being Daniel's Daughter (2008). She took the role because of the 'humanity' of the story.

Reception
The film did well for the network on the night of its premiere, ranking as the second-highest-rated ad-supported cable movie of the week with a 1.8 household rating.  It garnered over 2 million total viewers and 2.9 million unduplicated viewers.

The New York Times reviewed the film, saying,

The focus remained on Dickinson's performance, as the review continued, "Even as a cranky, elderly rancher fighting off casino developers, she has feminine allure.  There is no mystery to Mending Fences, but Ms. Dickinson adds a little mystique."

Filming locations
Although the film takes place in Nevada, filming of the ranch took place in Thousand Oaks, California.  Other filming took place in and around Santa Ynez, California.

References

External links
 Mending Fences at Hallmark Channel
 

2009 television films
2009 films
Hallmark Channel original films
Films set in Nevada
Films directed by Stephen Bridgewater